The 2012–13 Chattanooga Mocs basketball team represented the University of Tennessee at Chattanooga during the 2012–13 NCAA Division I men's basketball season. The Mocs, led by ninth year head coach John Shulman, played their home games at the McKenzie Arena and were members of the North Division of the Southern Conference. They finished the season 13–19, 8–10 in SoCon play to finish in fifth place in the North Division. They lost in the first round of the SoCon tournament to UNC Greensboro.

Roster

Schedule

|-
!colspan=9| Regular season

|-
!colspan=9| 2013 Southern Conference men's basketball tournament

References

Chattanooga Mocs men's basketball seasons
Chattanooga
Chattanooga Mocs
Chattanooga Mocs